Newlyn is a town near Penzance in Cornwall, England.

Newlyn may also refer to:

Places
Newlyn, a village near Newquay in Cornwall, England, now generally known as St Newlyn East
Newlyn Downs
Newlyn, West Virginia
Newlyn, Victoria, Australia

People with the forename
Saint Newlyn otherwise Noyale, a 5th-century Celtic saint

People with the surname
Lucy Newlyn (born 1956), British poet and academic
Robert Newlyn (1597-1688), English clergyman and academic
Robert Newlyn (MP) (fl. 1421), English politician

Other uses
HMS Newlyn, the intended name of a Hunt-class minesweeper, completed as HMS Newark in 1918 
Newlyn Copper, a class of arts and crafts copperware
Newlyn School, a school of artists